James William Falconer Anderson (25 February 1889 – 8 December 1951) was an Australian cricketer. He played in two first-class matches for Queensland in 1919/20.

See also
 List of Queensland first-class cricketers

References

External links
 

1889 births
1951 deaths
Australian cricketers
Queensland cricketers
Cricketers from Queensland